Tang-e Qaf (also Romanized as Tang-e Qāf) is a village in Donbaleh Rud-e Shomali Rural District, Dehdez District, Izeh County, Khuzestan Province, Iran. At the 2006 census, its population was 20, in 6 families.

References 

Populated places in Izeh County